Breandán Ó Madagáin (1932 – 9 January 2020) was an Irish scholar, writer and celticist.  He was Professor Emeritus and past Chair of Department of Irish, University College Galway, a member of the Royal Irish Academy, and was Chairman, 1995–2005, of the Board of Celtic Studies in the Dublin Institute for Advanced Studies.

Breandán Ó Madagáin was born in Limerick. His main contributions to Irish scholarship related to the history of sean-nós singing. He inaugurated courses in the history of Irish song at University College Galway, unique in their kind. He is well known for the thesis that the bulk of Irish Bardic Poetry was sung, and that many of the original melodies have been passed down through the oral tradition, although not always with their original lyrics.

Bibliography

Caointe Agus Seancheolta Eile, or Keening and other Old Irish Musics, Cló Iar-Chonnachta, Indreabhan, Ireland, 2005
An Ghaeilge i Luimneach 1700-1800
Functions of Irish Folk Song in the Nineteenth Century in: Béaloideas 1985. Galway: University College Galway. 130-216
 "Irish Vocal Music of Lament and Syllabic Verse"
 "Echoes of Magic in the Gaelic Song Tradition" 
 Languages and Celtic Peoples (Nova Scotia, Canada: St. Mary's University, 1992)

References

External links
 http://www.irishharpschool.com/breandan.htm
 https://www.ria.ie/breandan-o-madagain

1932 births
2020 deaths
20th-century Irish writers
Academics of the University of Galway
Writers from Limerick (city)
Celtic studies scholars
Irish-language writers

Academics of the Dublin Institute for Advanced Studies